Christmas and the Beads of Sweat is the fourth album by New York-born singer, songwriter, and pianist Laura Nyro. The album was released on the Columbia Records label in November 1970 after Nyro had recorded it in the early summer with producers Felix Cavaliere and Arif Mardin. Whilst Nyro had handed over production reins, she was still in control of the project and co-arranged her compositions.

The album is the closing part of a trilogy that also comprises 1968's Eli and the Thirteenth Confession and 1969's New York Tendaberry. Musically, the album is a bridge between the two, balancing the lighter and more joyful tones of Eli with the dark, sensual, and piano-dominated Tendaberry.

The presence of The Muscle Shoals Rhythm Section on side one lends the album a more easygoing, rock-inspired sound, but this is countered by Nyro's evocative lyrics and moody piano delivery. Nyro had by this time built up a strong reputation as a songwriter, and the album features star turns from Duane Allman, who adds a guitar solo to the driving "Beads of Sweat," and Alice Coltrane, who adds harp to side two.

The album, buoyed by Nyro's popularity as a songwriter, became her second commercially successful album in succession, peaking at #51 on the Billboard 200, known as the Pop Albums chart. The album is also responsible for spawning Nyro's sole chart hit single, with a cover of Gerry Goffin and Carole King's "Up on the Roof," which peaked at #92 on the Pop Singles chart, now known as the Billboard Hot 100.

Track listing
All songs written by Laura Nyro, except where noted.

Side one
"Brown Earth" – 4:09
"When I Was a Freeport and You Were the Main Drag" – 2:42
"Blackpatch" – 3:33
"Been on a Train" – 5:49
"Up on the Roof" (Gerry Goffin, Carole King) – 3:13

Side two
"Upstairs by a Chinese Lamp" – 5:34
"Map to the Treasure" – 8:08
"Beads of Sweat" – 4:47
"Christmas in My Soul" – 7:00

Personnel 
Laura Nyro – piano, vocals, arrangements

Additional musicians on side one
Barry Beckett – vibraphone
Felix Cavaliere – organ, bells, producer
Roger Hawkins – drums
Eddie Hinton – electric guitar
David Hood – bass
Jack Jennings – percussion
Stuart Scharf – acoustic guitar

Other musicians
The album credits these musicians but does not indicate which tracks they played on.
Duane Allman – guitar
Richard Davis – bass

Additional musicians on side two
Alice Coltrane – harp
Dino Danelli – drums
Cornell Dupree – electric guitar
Joe Farrell – woodwinds
Ashod Garabedian – oud
Ralph MacDonald – percussion
Chuck Rainey – bass
Michael Szittai – cimbalin

Technical
Arif Mardin – arrangements, conductor, producer
Roy Segal – engineer
Tim Geelan – engineer
Jerry Lee Smith – assistant engineer
Doug Pomeroy – assistant engineer
Beth O'Brien – cover portrait

References

Michele Kort's biography Soul Picnic: The Music and Passion of Laura Nyro

External links
 AllMusic

Laura Nyro albums
1970 albums
Albums produced by Arif Mardin
Albums produced by Felix Cavaliere
Columbia Records albums
Albums arranged by Arif Mardin
Albums conducted by Arif Mardin